Statistics of Swedish football Division 2 for the 2010 season.

League standings

Norrland 2010

Norra Svealand 2010

Södra Svealand 2010

Östra Götaland 2010

Västra Götaland 2010

Södra Götaland 2010

Player of the year awards

Ever since 2003 the online bookmaker Unibet have given out awards at the end of the season to the best players in Division 2. The recipients are decided by a jury of sportsjournalists, coaches and football experts. The names highlighted in green won the overall national award.

References
Sweden - List of final tables (Clas Glenning)

Swedish Football Division 2 seasons
4
Sweden
Sweden